There are 75 Grade I listed buildings in Tyne and Wear, England.

In England and Wales the authority for listing is granted by the Planning (Listed Buildings and Conservation Areas) Act 1990 and is administered by English Heritage, an agency of the Department for Culture, Media and Sport. In Tyne and Wear, the councils of Gateshead, Newcastle upon Tyne, North Tyneside, South Tyneside and Sunderland each maintain a list of Grade I listed buildings.

In the United Kingdom the term listed building refers to a building or other structure officially designated as being of special architectural, historical or cultural significance. Grade I buildings are described as being "buildings of outstanding or national architectural or historic interest".

Several of the entries relate to more than one listed structure where these have been grouped together as part of the same geographical location or where ancillary structures (such as walls and gates in front of a building) are listed separately.

Gateshead

|}

Newcastle upon Tyne

|}

North Tyneside

|}

South Tyneside

|}

Sunderland

|}

Notes

References 

National Heritage List for England

External links

 
Tyne and Wear
Lists of buildings and structures in Tyne and Wear